John Paul Phelan (born 27 September 1978) is an Irish Fine Gael politician who has been a Teachta Dála (TD) for the Carlow–Kilkenny constituency since the 2011 general election. He previously served as Minister of State for Local Government and Electoral Reform from 2017 to 2020. He also served as a Senator for the Labour Panel from 2002 to 2011.

Phelan attended national school in Listerlin, County Kilkenny, and Good Counsel College secondary school in New Ross before graduating from Waterford Institute of Technology with an Economics and Finance degree. He was elected to Kilkenny County Council in 1999 for the Piltown local electoral area, the youngest person ever elected to the council.

He was elected in 2002 to Seanad Éireann as a Senator for the Agricultural Panel, the youngest member of the 22nd Seanad, and was re-elected in 2007. He was the Fine Gael Seanad Spokesperson on Enterprise, Trade and Employment, having previously held the portfolio of Seanad Spokesperson on Finance.

In the 2007 general election, he was beaten for the last seat by Mary White of the Green Party. He was a candidate at the 2009 European Parliament election for the East constituency but was not elected.

He was elected as a Fine Gael TD for the Carlow–Kilkenny constituency at the 2011 general election.

Phelan has sat on the Joint Oireachtas Committee on Justice, Law and Defence. He is one of the Irish delegates sitting on the Parliamentary Assembly of the Council of Europe and is an Irish representative on the British–Irish Parliamentary Assembly. He was critical of the Government decision to change the rules regarding the Domiciliary Care Allowance its effect on families of children with Autism. On 10 November 2012, Phelan took part in the "Save our Services" protest march in Waterford.

He called for a "No" vote in the 2018 Referendum on Abortion. He has spearheaded legislation which may force political parties to fill 40% of their nominations with migrants, women and ethnic minorities in future elections.

At the general election in February 2020, he was re-elected in the Carlow–Kilkenny constituency. He continued to serve as minister until the new Fianna Fáil–Fine Gael–Green coalition government was formed in June 2020.

References

External links
John Paul Phelan's page at the Fine Gael website

 

1978 births
Living people
Alumni of Waterford Institute of Technology
Fine Gael TDs
Local councillors in County Kilkenny
Members of the 22nd Seanad
Members of the 23rd Seanad
Members of the 31st Dáil
Members of the 32nd Dáil
Members of the 33rd Dáil
Young Fine Gael
Fine Gael senators
Ministers of State of the 32nd Dáil
People educated at St Augustine's and Good Counsel College, New Ross